Clifton is the largest city in Bosque County, in Central Texas in the United States. The city's population was 3,442 at the 2010 census.

Geography

Clifton is located at  (31.780275, –97.580825).

Climate
The climate in this area is characterized by hot, humid summers and generally mild to cool winters.  According to the Köppen climate classification, Clifton has a humid subtropical climate, Cfa on climate maps.

Local media
Clifton and Bosque County are currently listed as part of the Dallas-Fort Worth DMA. However, Bosque County is a neighboring county of the Waco metropolitan area, meaning that all of the Waco/Temple–Killeen market stations also provide coverage for Clifton and Bosque County.

The Clifton Record is the local newspaper.

Demographics

2020 census

As of the 2020 United States census, there were 3,465 people, 1,358 households, and 925 families residing in the city.

2000 census
As of the census of 2000, there were 3,542 people, 1,296 households, and 864 families residing in the city. The population density was 1,852.2 people per square mile (716.0/km2). There were 1,422 housing units at an average density of 743.6 per square mile (287.5/km2). The racial makeup of the city was 86.02% White, 3.36% African American, 0.34% Native American, 0.17% Asian, 8.98% from other races, and 1.13% from two or more races. Hispanic or Latino of any race were 18.83% of the population.

There were 1,296 households, out of which 31.9% had children under the age of 18 living with them, 54.2% were married couples living together, 9.9% had a female householder with no husband present, and 33.3% were non-families. 31.3% of all households were made up of individuals, and 20.4% had someone living alone who was 65 years of age or older. The average household size was 2.46 and the average family size was 3.09.

In the city, the population was spread out, with 25.0% under the age of 18, 6.6% from 18 to 24, 22.3% from 25 to 44, 18.9% from 45 to 64, and 27.2% who were 65 years of age or older. The median age was 42 years. For every 100 females, there were 81.6 males. For every 100 females age 18 and over, there were 75.1 males.

The median income for a household in the city was $29,867, and the median income for a family was $41,548. Males had a median income of $27,472 versus $25,154 for females. The per capita income for the city was $14,823. About 9.6% of families and 12.7% of the population were below the poverty line, including 14.0% of those under age 18 and 20.0% of those age 65 or over.

History

Clifton was founded in the winter of 1852–1853, when the families of Frank Kell, Joseph A. Kemp, Samuel and Monroe Locker, and T. A. McSpadden settled in the vicinity. The town was named Cliff Town after the surrounding limestone cliffs. Over the years the name was altered to Clifton. The site was originally on the banks of Clear Branch. The Masonic lodge hall and a log schoolhouse were the first public buildings. The post office was established in 1859. The First Presbyterian Church of Clifton was organized in 1861 and is the county's oldest church in continuous service. The Baptists built the first church building in Clifton in 1884–1885. After the Civil War, Joel Martin Stinnett (1806–1875), the grandfather of Joseph Kemp, built a flour mill powered by the Bosque River. In 1868, this mill was replaced by a limestone mill, which was converted to the electric power plant that provided the first electricity for Clifton homes and businesses. A three-story school known as Rock School was built about 1870 and served the community for more than twenty years. In 1893, a new building was constructed on property donated to the Clifton school system.

In 1880 the Gulf, Colorado and Santa Fe Railway built a station a mile south of Clifton. Merchants moved their businesses closer to the railroad station, and the town thrived as a business and trade center. The Merchant Exchange and Flour Mill, the first steam flour mill in the Bosque valley, was established in 1887 or 1888. The Clifton Record, a newspaper that began publishing in 1895 under the ownership of W. C. O'Brian, continued to serve the community. Clifton served as the county seat between 1890 and 1892. Clifton Lutheran College, later known as Clifton College, opened in 1896. The community was incorporated in 1901. An earlier attempt at incorporation in 1891 failed when the election results were declared invalid. A fire on December 23, 1906, destroyed a large portion of the business district, which was eventually rebuilt. The Clifton Volunteer Fire Department was organized in 1907. The town's need for a hospital was met by Dr. V. D. Goodall and Dr. S. L. Witcher, who formed the Goodall-Witcher Hospital in 1938, which is still operating today along with the Clifton Clinic. The Lutheran Sunset Home for the elderly was established in Clifton in 1954. In 1991, the Bosque River flooded much of the town due to torrential rains. The town had an estimated population of 204 in 1904 and 3,542 in 2000. It now has a population of 3,442.

On December 21, 1929, a weather station near Clifton recorded 24 inches of snowfall.  This is the greatest daily snowfall recorded for anywhere in Texas.

On January 15, 2017 an EF1 Tornado struck Clifton damaging at least 25 homes.  Although no injuries were reported, the heaviest damage was in town near the intersection of Pecan and Avenue G.

Culture
In May 1997, the Texas Legislature officially designated Clifton as the Norwegian Capital of Texas. Clifton and the surrounding area was settled by Norwegian immigrants in the mid-19th century. The nearby community of Norse is the final resting place of Cleng Peerson, commonly recognized as the "Father of Norwegian Immigration to America." The founder of Norse was Ole Canuteson (Ole Knudsen) from the Stavanger region of Norway.

Visitors to Clifton may explore the vast collection of pioneer Norwegian articles at the Bosque Memorial Museum, or take the Cleng Peerson Memorial Highway west to the Norse Historic District. Sites along the route include many 19th century homes and churches. Among them is Our Savior's Lutheran Church, which was established in 1869. The church is the annual site of the Norse Smorgasbord, a feast of traditional foods introduced to the area by Norwegian settlers. Further down the road a Lutefisk dinner is held annually in Cranfills Gap, near the site of the historic St. Olaf Kirke, often called the Old Rock Church.

Clifton celebrates its Norwegian heritage each year with the Norwegian Country Christmas Tour, held the first Saturday of December. The daylong event features demonstrations of Norwegian crafts, tours of homes and buildings harkening back to the days of the early settlers, and many other related activities. The 1999 tour was a featured Road Trip appearing in the November 1999 issue of Texas Highways.

The City of Clifton was officially designated a Cultural District by the Texas Commission on the Arts and the State of Texas on Saturday, October 22, 2011. Clifton is home to the Bosque Arts Center. Housed in a restored three-story building that was the former Main Hall of Clifton College, the organization offers a local outlet for visual and performing arts unique for a city of Clifton's size. Among its many offerings are a performing theater, classes in a variety of subjects, an annual photography show and a nationally recognized art show, the Conservatory Art Classic. Clifton has twice been designated as one of the top 100 small art communities in the nation. It is home to nationally recognized artists, including several members of the prestigious Cowboy Artists of America. Artist Merritt Mauzey received the first Guggenheim Foundation fellowship in fine arts ever awarded to a Texan in 1946. His works are sold locally at the Bosque County Emporium.

Education

Clifton is served by the Clifton Independent School District.
 Clifton High School (Grades 9–12)
 Clifton Middle School (Grades 6–8)
 Clifton Intermediate School (Grades 3–5)
 Clifton Elementary School (Grades PreK–2)

Notable people

 Dan Campbell, NFL head coach of the Detroit Lions
 Bobby Joe Conrad, NFL wide receiver, Pro Bowl and First-team All-Pro selection
 Zach Duke, MLB pitcher, 2009 All-Star selection
 Bernie Erickson, NFL linebacker
 Josh Grelle, anime voice actor
 Merritt Mauzey, printmaker and children's book author/illustrator
 C.E. "Pat" Olsen, professional baseball player, engineer, oil tool designer, founder of Gearench Mfg Co., major land donor to City of Clifton

Photo Gallery

References

Further reading
 Pool, William C.Bosque Territory (Kyle, Texas: Chaparral, 1964)
 Pool, William C. A History of Bosque County (San Marcos, Texas: San Marcos Record Press, 1954)

External links
 

Cities in Texas
Cities in Bosque County, Texas